Wings Event Center (formerly Wings Stadium) is a 5,113-seat multi-purpose arena located in Kalamazoo, Michigan. The arena,  opened in 1974,  is home to the Kalamazoo Wings, an ice hockey team in the ECHL. The stadium changed the name to the Wings Event Center on March 25, 2015 to market the arena's other hosting capabilities to companies and promoters.

The complex features four concession stands and two bars along the concourse, as well as the Underground Sports Bar. The main arena is a part of a sports and convention complex serving southwest Michigan.

As a concert venue, the stadium can seat up to 8,023 spectators; as a convention center it can accommodate  of trade show and exhibit space. Along with numerous concerts, the stadium has also hosted a number of World Wrestling Entertainment (WWE) events. On April 8, 1992, the facility hosted a World Wrestling Federation (WWF) taping of its Superstars TV show, as well as other shows including Prime Time Wrestling and All American Wrestling. The Superstars episodes later aired on April 18, 1992, with additional episodes airing April 25 and May 2, 1992. The French version of Superstars aired on June 3, 1992. The April 18th edition is notable for being the first usage of the 'Superstars' only title, after the company dropped the previous name 'Superstars of Wrestling'. Meanwhile, the All American Wrestling episode aired April 19, 1992. The Prime Time Wrestling episodes aired April 20, 27 and June 22, 1992. It was at these tapings that The 
Ultimate Warrior had what would become his first televised match since leaving the WWF the previous year. He defeated Skinner in a bout that would air on the 5/2/92 Superstars.

In 1989, the Valley (formerly known as the Annex), seating 1,367 for hockey and up to 2,850 for other events, was added; it also has  of arena floor space and can be used for hockey, curling, trade shows, conventions and other events. It also has a  viewing area.

There is also a  viewing area at the arena.

The complex has a  lobby and a  hospitality room, a separate concession stand and a bar called the Icehouse by Old Burdick's, which overlooks the Annex.

Gallery

References

External links

Wings Event Center Homepage

Sports venues completed in 1974
Indoor arenas in Michigan
Indoor ice hockey venues in Michigan
Indoor soccer venues in Michigan
Convention centers in Michigan
Sports venues in Michigan
Buildings and structures in Kalamazoo, Michigan
Sports in Kalamazoo, Michigan
Tourist attractions in Kalamazoo, Michigan
1974 establishments in Michigan